Cassa Centrale Banca - Credito Cooperativo del Nord Est S.p.A. is a coordinating institute of the cooperative banks (rural credit union) of Trentino, based in Trento, Trentino, Italy. Some cooperative banks (rural credit union) of Veneto, Friuli and Venezia Giulia are also members.

History
In 2017 the central institution applied to be one of the central banks for proposed co-operative banking groups of whole Italy. The other candidate was ICCREA Banca (and Raiffeisen Landesbank Südtirol – Cassa Centrale Raiffeisen dell'Alto Adige for South Tyrol autonomous province only). A new Italian law required all co-operative banks of Italy to join a banking group, which the central institution has power to recapitalize individual member banks, but the central institution itself would be owned by the member banks in a majority. Cassa Centrale Banca - Credito Cooperativo del Nord Est had proposed to change their name to Cassa Centrale Banca – Credito Cooperativo Italiano.

Joint ventures
Cassa Centrale Banca had a joint venture "Casse Rurali – Raiffeisen Finanziaria" with its South Tyrol counterpart. The joint venture was the largest shareholder of Investitionsbank  – Mediocredito of South Tyrol - Trentino autonomous region.

Cassa Centrale Banca had another joint venture Nord Est Asset Management S.A. (NEAM in short).

Shareholders
The bank was owned by the member banks directly. However, in order to sell 25% shares to DZ Bank, a new holding company Centrale Finanziaria del Nord Est was established in 2007, in order for the member banks to have a controlling influence in the central institute.

References

Cooperative banks of Italy
Financial services companies established in 1974
1974 establishments in Italy
Companies based in Trentino
Trento
Government of Trentino
Region-owned companies of Italy